Allerheiligen (Dutch and German for All Saints) may refer to:

Kloster Allerheiligen; see All Saints' Abbey (Baden-Württemberg) 
Allerheiligen im Mühlkreis, a municipality in Upper Austria, Austria
Allerheiligen im Mürztal, a municipality in Styria, Austria
Allerheiligen bei Wildon, a municipality in Styria, Austria
Allerheiligenberg Monastery, a former Monastery in Lahnstein, Rhineland-Palatinate, Germany